Physicians for Social Responsibility (PSR) is a physician-led organization in the US working to protect the public from the threats of nuclear proliferation, climate change, and environmental toxins. It produces and disseminates publications, provides specialized training, offers written and oral testimony to congress, conducts media interviews, and delivers professional and public education.  PSR's members and e-activists, state and local chapters, student chapters, and national staff form a nationwide network that target what they consider threats to global survival, specifically nuclear warfare, nuclear proliferation, global warming, and toxic degradation of the environment.

Organizational history
PSR was founded in Boston in 1961 by a group of physicians concerned about the public health dangers associated with the testing, stockpiling and use of nuclear weapons.  Drs. Bernard Lown, Victor W. Sidel, Sidney Alexander, H. Jack Geiger, Alexander Leaf, Charles Magraw, George Saxton, Robert Goldwyn, and Bernard Leon Winter (1921–1985) were among the founding group of physicians.  PSR's initial reports described the real human, physical, social and environmental consequences of a nuclear war. PSR originally opposed atmospheric nuclear testing by documenting the presence of testing byproduct strontium-90 in children's teeth.

Rebirth of PSR in the late 1970s

By 1973 the organization was not active and in effect ceased to exist. In 1978, Helen Caldicott, MD was asked by Arnold Relman, the then editor to write an article for the NEJM on the medical dangers of nuclear power. She was subsequently visited by a young intern from Cambridge City Hospital at Children's Hospital Medical Center where she worked in the cystic fibrosis unit, to ask for some relevant papers on nuclear power. After some discussion with him, Caldicott said - you know this is a medical issue, let's start a medical organization. The first meeting held a week later at the Boston home of Helen and Bill Caldicott with several physicians in attendance including one who had been the past the secretary of the old PSR, Richard Feinbloom. Feinbloom suggested that instead of bothering to incorporate a new organization in the state of Massachusetts, the group take the name of the old and then defunct Physicians for Social Responsibility and use it. They did.

This newly reinvigorated organization took off soon after. One of the initial organizational actions was to place an ad in the New England Journal of Medicine outlining what they considered to be the medical implications of nuclear power. The ad was serendipitously published the day after Three Mile Island melted down attracting 500 new members. Over five years the new PSR recruited 23,000 physician members and organized approximately 153 chapters in the US. Caldicott served as the President of PSR from 1978 until 1984 when she resigned.
Dr Caldicott travelled widely and founded similar physicians organizations in other countries including England, Ireland, Scotland, Japan, New Zealand, Canada, Holland, Germany, Belgium, Scandinavia, and Australia.

Founding of the International Physicians for the Prevention of Nuclear War (IPPNW)
PSR's work to educate the public about the dangers of nuclear war grew into an international movement with the founding of International Physicians for the Prevention of Nuclear War in 1980.  In 1980 Bernard Lown co-founded, with Evgeni Chazov of the Soviet Union, IPPNW, with PSR as its American affiliate and branches in many other nations, to continue this educational effort on a global scale. As the U.S. affiliate of this global professional network, PSR shared in the 1985 Nobel Peace Prize awarded to IPPNW "for spreading authoritative information and by creating an awareness of the catastrophic consequences of atomic warfare."

PSR today
Today, PSR's security program works to improve national policy formulation and decision-making about nuclear weapons and technology through the combined efforts of credible, committed health professionals and active and concerned citizen members. PSR articulates both the health threats and the security threats posed by nuclear weapons, as well as the importance of implementing new approaches to reduce U.S. reliance on nuclear weapons in national security policy. PSR works to lead the U.S. toward the ultimate elimination of nuclear weapons.

Since 1992, when PSR formally created its environment and health program, PSR has worked to address global warming and the toxic degradation of the environment. PSR presses for policies to curb global warming, generate what they consider to be a sustainable energy future, minimize toxic pollution of air, food and drinking water, and prevent human exposure to toxic substances.  PSR's Code Black program has been a voice in the movement to reduce U.S. reliance on coal-fired power plants.  Coal's Assault on Human Health, released in November 2009, is a groundbreaking report that reviews and summarizes the latest peer-reviewed medical literature on coal pollution, providing a full picture of how coal affects human health from mining to combustion to the disposal of post-combustion waste.

In 2008, concerned about the push to promote nuclear energy as the solution to environmental problems, PSR launched what they called a safe energy program aimed at stopping the construction of new nuclear power plants and to sound the alarm about what they consider to be the true costs of, and the dangers associated with, nuclear energy.

Student Physicians for Social Responsibility (SPSR), a network of 39 chapters and 650 students, mobilizes medical students to engage in the work against nuclear proliferation, environmental degradation, and social justice issues.  SPSR orients every new generation of medical students to be engaged in creating positive change through medical activism.

PSR state and local chapters work on a range of issues, including the 'greening' of hospitals, what they consider sustainable agriculture, health care reform, and domestic violence.  Several PSR chapters are also active in the gun control movement, working to ban handguns in the United States.

Since the 2016 presidential election, leaders of PSR have sought to critique the administration's policies regarding nuclear weapons and climate change in op-ed pieces in major newspapers. PSR advocates the extension of the New Strategic Arms Reduction Treaty between the United States and Russia scheduled to expire February 5, 2021. Local chapters have successfully persuaded a number of city and county legislatures to endorse the Back from the Brink Campaign urging US government actions to prevent nuclear war

References

External links 
 PSR.org home page

Political advocacy groups in the United States
Anti–nuclear weapons movement
Anti-nuclear organizations based in the United States
Climate change organizations based in the United States
Medical and health organizations based in the United States
Advocacy groups in the United States